Jin Zheng is a visually impaired Chinese Paralympic athlete. She represented China at the 2016 Summer Paralympics held in Rio de Janeiro, Brazil and she won the gold medal in the women's 1500 metres T11 event.

References

External links 
 

Living people
Year of birth missing (living people)
Place of birth missing (living people)
Paralympic athletes with a vision impairment
Medalists at the 2016 Summer Paralympics
Athletes (track and field) at the 2016 Summer Paralympics
Paralympic athletes of China
Paralympic gold medalists for China
Chinese female middle-distance runners
Paralympic medalists in athletics (track and field)
Chinese blind people